Sphingnotus insignis is a species of beetle belonging to the family Cerambycidae.

Description 
Head, prothorax and elitra have a brilliant metallic blue colour and bear small white spots. The surface has an irregular puntation arranged in longitudinal lines.

Distribution
This species can be found in New Guinea.

List of subspecies
Sphingnotus insignis albertisi Gestro, 1876 
Sphingnotus insignis ammiralis Breuning, 1945
Sphingnotus insignis insignis Perroud, 1855

References
 Biolib
 Global species

Tmesisternini
Beetles described in 1855